Shae Audley (born 13 June 1988) is a former Australian rules footballer who played 16 matches over three seasons with the Carlton Football Club in the AFL Women's competition (AFLW). She was drafted by Carlton with the club's sixth selection and the forty sixthy overall in the 2016 AFL Women's draft. She made her debut in Round 1, 2017, in the club and the league's inaugural match at Ikon Park against . Audley finished 2017 having played in all seven of Carlton's matches that season.

References

External links

 
 

Living people
1988 births
Carlton Football Club (AFLW) players
Australian rules footballers from Victoria (Australia)
Sportswomen from Victoria (Australia)
Victorian Women's Football League players